The Aero Car was a planned American automobile.  It was to have used a two-cycle engine to drive a propeller.  The car, whose wheelbase was only , was to have sold for $160.  One prototype was made, in 1921, before the project was shelved.

The prototype is on display at the National Automobile Museum, Reno, Nevada.

Vintage vehicles
Defunct motor vehicle manufacturers of the United States